Bernieulles is a commune in the Pas-de-Calais department in the Hauts-de-France region in northern France.

Geography
A small village situated some 8 miles (13 km) north of Montreuil-sur-Mer, on the D147 road.

Population

See also
Communes of the Pas-de-Calais department

References

Communes of Pas-de-Calais